Fort Brown Site is a historic former redoubt located on the Saranac River at Plattsburgh in Clinton County, New York.  It was built during the War of 1812 and used in Battle of Plattsburgh.  It had eight guns and four interior buildings.

It was listed on the National Register of Historic Places in 1978.

The site is part of now Fort Brown Park and is operated by the City of Plattsburgh.

References

External links
New York State Division of Military and Naval Affairs, Fort Brown Site

Archaeological sites on the National Register of Historic Places in New York (state)
Government buildings completed in 1814
Infrastructure completed in 1814
Brown
Parks in Clinton County, New York
Brown
National Register of Historic Places in Clinton County, New York